The 2012 MasterCard Memorial Cup was a four-team, round-robin format ice hockey tournament played from May 18–27, 2012 at the Centre Bionest in Shawinigan, Quebec.  It was the 94th Memorial Cup championship and determined the champion of the Canadian Hockey League (CHL).  The tournament featured the London Knights, champions of the Ontario Hockey League (OHL); the Saint John Sea Dogs, champions of the Quebec Major Junior Hockey League (QMJHL); the Edmonton Oil Kings, champions of the Western Hockey League (WHL); and the Shawinigan Cataractes, who won the right to host the tournament over bids by the Saint John Sea Dogs, Halifax Mooseheads and Cape Breton Screaming Eagles.

On May 27, the Shawinigan Cataractes defeated the London Knights 2–1 in overtime to win the Memorial Cup for the first time ever in franchise history, becoming just the second team after the 2009 Windsor Spitfires to win the Memorial Cup after playing in the tiebreaker game; the first host to win the Memorial Cup at home since the Vancouver Giants in 2007; and the first QMJHL host to win the Memorial Cup since the Hull Olympiques in 1997. The Cataractes win also gave the QMJHL back-to-back Memorial Cups for the first time since the Granby Prédateurs in 1996 and the Hull Olympiques in 1997.

Round-robin standings

For the first time since the current tournament format was established in 1983, the teams each split their first two games. At the conclusion of the round-robin, the tiebreaker between the first and second team as well as between the third and fourth placed team were decided by head-to-head records.

Note: Shawinigan finished fourth based on head-to-head round-robin matchups but defeated Edmonton in the tiebreaker game.

Schedule
All times local (UTC −4)

Round robin

Playoff round

Statistical leaders

Skaters

GP = Games played; G = Goals; A = Assists; Pts = Points; PIM = Penalty minutes

Goaltending

This is a combined table of the top goaltenders based on goals against average and save percentage with at least sixty minutes played. The table is sorted by GAA.

GP = Games played; W = Wins; L = Losses; SA = Shots against; GA = Goals against; GAA = Goals against average; SV% = Save percentage; SO = Shutouts; TOI = Time on ice (minutes:seconds)

Awards
Stafford Smythe Memorial Trophy (MVP) – Michael Chaput (Shawinigan Cataractes)
Ed Chynoweth Trophy (Leading Scorer) – Michael Chaput (Shawinigan Cataractes)
George Parsons Trophy (Sportsmanlike) – Zack Phillips (Saint John Sea Dogs)
Hap Emms Memorial Trophy (Top Goalie) – Gabriel Girard (Shawinigan Cataractes)
All-Star Team:
Goaltender: Michael Houser (London Knights)
Defence: Jarred Tinordi (London Knights), Brandon Gormley (Shawinigan Cataractes)
Forwards: Henrik Samuelsson (Edmonton Oil Kings), Austin Watson (London Knights), Michael Chaput (Shawinigan Cataractes)

Rosters
References:

Shawinigan Cataractes (Host)
Head coach: Eric Veilleux

Saint John Sea Dogs (QMJHL)
Head coach: Gerard Gallant

London Knights (OHL)
Head coach:Mark Hunter

Edmonton Oil Kings (WHL)
Head coach: Derek Laxdal

Road to the Cup

OHL playoffs

QMJHL playoffs

WHL playoffs

References

External links
 Memorial Cup
 Canadian Hockey League

2012
2011–12 in Canadian ice hockey
2012 in Quebec